|}

The Moscow Flyer Novice Hurdle is a Grade 2 National Hunt hurdle race in Ireland. It is run at Punchestown Racecourse in January, over a distance of about 2 miles (3,219 metres) and during the race there are nine hurdles to be jumped. The race was first run in 2003 and was called the Byrne Group Novice Hurdle, before changing its name in 2009 to honour the racehorse, Moscow Flyer.

Records
Leading jockey (4 wins):
 Ruby Walsh – Mikael D'Haguenet (2009), Mozoltov (2013), Douvan (2015), Min (2016) 
 Paul Townend - Gagewell Flyer (2011), Vautour (2014), Dysart Dynamo (2022), Impaire Et Passe (2023)

Leading trainer (9 wins):
 Willie Mullins – Mikael D'Haguenet (2009), Gagewell Flyer (2011), Mozoltov (2013), Vautour (2014), Douvan (2015), Min (2016), Getabird (2018), Dysart Dynamo (2022), Impaire Et Passe (2023)

Winners

See also
 Horse racing in Ireland
 List of Irish National Hunt races

References
Racing Post:

National Hunt races in Ireland
National Hunt hurdle races
Punchestown Racecourse
Recurring sporting events established in 2003
2003 establishments in Ireland